George VII (Georgian: გიორგი VII) (died 1405 or 1407) was king of Georgia from 1393 to 1407 (alternatively, from 1395 to 1405).

George was the son of the king Bagrat V and his first wife Elene of Trebizond (died of bubonic plague, 1366). Bagrat appointed him co-ruler in 1369.

In November 1386, King Bagrat was defeated and taken prisoner by the Turco-Mongol warlord Timur (or Tamerlane). Prince George organized a successful resistance to the next incursion and released his father. In 1393, Bagrat died and George assumed full royal powers. He spent most of his reign fighting Timur who led seven more expeditions against the stubborn Georgian kingdom from 1387 to 1403, leaving the country in ruins. Finally, in 1403 George had to make peace with the fierce enemy, recognising Timur as a suzerain and paying him tribute, but retaining the right to be crowned as a Christian monarch. He was killed in battle against the Turkmen nomads, apparently of the Kara Koyunlu clan.

George VII may have died childless, as his brother Constantine I became the next king.

References

External links

Kings of Georgia
Bagrationi dynasty of the Kingdom of Georgia
Monarchs killed in action
14th-century births
1400s deaths
Eastern Orthodox monarchs